James Kyle Farmer (born August 17, 1990) is an American professional baseball shortstop for the Minnesota Twins of Major League Baseball (MLB). He has previously played in MLB for the Los Angeles Dodgers and Cincinnati Reds.

Career

Amateur sports
Farmer graduated from the Marist School in Atlanta, Georgia, where he played baseball and football. While at Marist, Farmer appeared in the major Hollywood film The Blind Side (2009), playing a high school quarterback.

During his college baseball career at the University of Georgia (UGA), Farmer played shortstop, hitting for a .308 batting average and recording a .968 fielding percentage, a UGA Baseball team record at the shortstop position. In 2011, he played collegiate summer baseball with the Bourne Braves of the Cape Cod Baseball League. Farmer was originally drafted by the New York Yankees in the 35th round of the 2012 Major League Baseball draft, but did not sign. He was then drafted by the Los Angeles Dodgers in the 8th round (244th overall pick) of the 2013 Major League Baseball draft and signed a contract with the team.

Minor leagues
The Dodgers made the decision to convert Farmer into a catcher. In 2014, he made his pro baseball debut with the Ogden Raptors of the Pioneer League, then was promoted to the Great Lakes Loons of the Midwest League, later that year. After 57 games with Great Lakes – where he hit .310 – Farmer was promoted again to the Rancho Cucamonga Quakes of the California League, where he batted .238 in 36 games.

Farmer began 2015 with the Quakes, where he was selected to the mid-season All-Star team. Farmer did not play in the game due to his subsequent promotion to the Double-A Tulsa Drillers of the Texas League. Farmer was selected to represent the Dodgers organization at the All-Star Futures Game, in 2015. He played in 76 games for Tulsa and hit .272. Farmer returned to Tulsa to start the 2016 season and was selected to the mid-season all-star game. He played in 74 games for the Drillers in 2016, hitting .256 with five home runs and 31 runs batted in (RBI). The Dodgers added Farmer to their 40-man roster, after the season. He was promoted to the Triple-A Oklahoma City Dodgers during the 2017 season.

Major leagues

Los Angeles Dodgers
Farmer was first called up to the big leagues, on July 28, 2017. Two days later, in his first major league at bat, Farmer hit a walk-off two-run double off of Albert Suárez of the San Francisco Giants, in the bottom of the 11th inning, giving the Dodgers a 3–2 win. Farmer appeared in 20 games for the Dodgers in 2017, primarily as a pinch hitter, and had six hits in 20 at-bats (.300). He made the Dodgers roster for the 2017 NLDS and 2017 NLCS, having four at bats as a pinch hitter, without recording a hit.

In 2018 Farmer appeared in 24 games in the field for the Dodgers, 22 of them at third base. He posted a stat line of .235/.312/.324 in 68 at bats.

Cincinnati Reds
On December 21, 2018, the Dodgers traded Farmer to the Cincinnati Reds, along with Yasiel Puig, Alex Wood, Matt Kemp, and cash considerations in exchange for Homer Bailey, Jeter Downs, and Josiah Gray. 

In 2019, Farmer hit .230 with 9 home runs and 27 RBIs in 97 games. The following season, he hit .266 in 32 games.  On December 2, 2020, Farmer was nontendered by the Reds and resigned on a 1-year contract. In 2021, Farmer played in his first full season, hitting .263/.316/.416 with 16 home runs and 63 RBIs in 147 games.

During the early season of 2022, Farmer had 0 hits in 34 at-bats, which is the longest streak by a Reds position player since 1954. Farmer then ended that streak with a 3-run homerun in a game against the Milwaukee Brewers.

Minnesota Twins
On November 18, 2022, Farmer was traded to the Minnesota Twins in exchange for Casey Legumina.

On January 13, 2023, Farmer agreed to a one-year, $5.585 million contract with the Twins, avoiding salary arbitration.

Personal life
Farmer proposed to his girlfriend, Courtney Sayre, in July 2017, and they married in 2018. They reside in Atlanta and have one son together.

Farmer grew up a fan of the Atlanta Braves.

References

External links

1990 births
Living people
Baseball players from Atlanta
Major League Baseball catchers
Los Angeles Dodgers players
Cincinnati Reds players
Georgia Bulldogs baseball players
Bourne Braves players
Ogden Raptors players
Great Lakes Loons players
Rancho Cucamonga Quakes players
Tulsa Drillers players
Glendale Desert Dogs players
Arizona League Dodgers players
Oklahoma City Dodgers players
Marist School (Georgia) alumni